William Green (born December 17, 1979) is a former American football running back. He played college football for Boston College, and received consensus All-American honors.  The Cleveland Browns chose him in the first round of the 2002 NFL Draft and he appeared in 46 games for Cleveland between 2002 and 2005.

Early years
Green was born in Atlantic City, New Jersey. His father was a heroin addict who died of AIDS when Green was 13 years old.  His mother died of the disease a year later after being infected by his father. After his parents' deaths, Green was separated from his four siblings.

Green attended Holy Spirit High School in Absecon, New Jersey, where he played for the Holy Spirit Spartans high school football team and received multiple high school All-American honors.

College career
Green received an athletic scholarship to attend Boston College, and played for the Boston College Eagles football team from 1998 to 2001.  In two years as a starting running back, he compiled over 2,700 yards rushing and 32 touchdowns.  He was a first-team All-Big East Conference selection in 2000 and 2001, was honored as the Big East Offensive Player of the Year, and was recognized as a consensus first-team All-American in 2001, after receiving first-team honors from the American Football Coaches Association (AFCA), The Sporting News, the Walter Camp Football Foundation, Football News and Pro Football Weekly.

College statistics

Professional career

In the 2002 NFL Draft, Green was a top-rated player.  However, two college suspensions for marijuana use hurt his stock on draft day.

Cleveland selected him as 16th overall pick in the first round of the 2002 NFL Draft. As a rookie in 2002, Green appeared in all 16 regular season games and started ten of them, gaining 887 yards and scoring six touchdowns. In a home game with playoff implications versus Atlanta late in the season, Green provided Browns fans with one of the most memorable moments of the new Browns. He ran a 64-yard touchdown to put the Browns ahead for good in a play known as "Run William Run!" due to radio play by play man Jim Donovan's call of the play.

His 2003 season, however, was fraught with turmoil.  After a good start with 559 yards, Green was arrested for drunk driving and marijuana possession.  Green was also notoriously seen wearing one shoe and one sock during the arrest.  The arrest led to a four-game suspension under the league's substance abuse policy.  While under suspension, Green's fiancée, Asia Gray, stabbed him in the back during a domestic dispute.  The league extended his suspension through the end of the 2003 season "for treatment purposes."

In 2004, Green gained 585 yards on the season. On November 14, he was ejected prior to a game with the Pittsburgh Steelers for fighting with linebacker Joey Porter. Around this time, he had disclosed that he was having a child with a woman other than his wife.

His final season in Cleveland was an injury-plagued 2005 campaign where he appeared in eight games and gained only 78 yards.  The Browns placed him on injured reserve at the end of training camp in 2006 and reached an injury settlement with Green allowing them to release him.

In March 2008, it was reported that Green would attempt to play in the NFL again after two seasons out of the league. He worked out at his alma mater Boston College's Pro Day on March 19, showing up in "great shape," bench-pressing 225 pounds 25 times and posting a 42-inch vertical leap, but also ran a 4.85 forty yard dash. However, he did not sign a contract.

NFL statistics
Rushing stats 

Receiving stats

Personal life
Prior to his 2008 NFL comeback attempt, Green became a Christian.  He became a motivational speaker at corporate, church, and school events.  His speeches are typically about forgiveness and overcoming struggles.  In 2012, he became an ordained minister.

He is the father of eight children, seven with his wife, Asia Gray, and one from a previous relationship.  All eight children live with him and his wife on a four-acre property in Berlin, New Jersey.

References

External links
 Cleveland Browns bio
 Motivational Speaking website

1979 births
Living people
African-American players of American football
All-American college football players
American football running backs
Boston College Eagles football players
Cleveland Browns players
Sportspeople from Atlantic City, New Jersey
Players of American football from New Jersey
Holy Spirit High School (New Jersey) alumni
21st-century African-American sportspeople
20th-century African-American sportspeople